Stronger Than Death is the second studio album by American heavy metal band Black Label Society. It was initially released in Japan on March 7, 2000, with 11 tracks and in a blood red jewel case. It was released outside Japan almost a month and a half later with only 10 tracks and in clear jewel case.

Track listing

Personnel
Black Label Society
Zakk Wylde – guitars, vocals, bass, piano
Phil Ondich (credited as "Philth") – drums

Additional performance
Mike Piazza – death growls on "Stronger Than Death"

Production
Produced by Zakk Wylde
Engineered by Lee DeCarlo with Sam Storey
Mixed by Zakk Wylde and Lee DeCarlo, assisted by Rony Brack
Mastered by Ron Boustead, Lee DeCarlo, Zakk Wylde, and Rony Brack
A&R – Paul Bibeau
Mogul – Dennis Clapp
Art concept, design, and layout – Black Label Society
Art direction – John Buttino
Illustrations – Philth
Photography – William Haymes
Tray photo – Sven Isaakson

Charts

References

2000 albums
Black Label Society albums
Spitfire Records albums